Selenone can mean:
 Selone, a variant of a carbonyl having a selenium atom in place of the oxygen
 A variant of a sulfone having a selenium atom in place of the sulfur